The Emirates Office Tower, is a 54-floor office building along Sheikh Zayed Road in the city of Dubai, United Arab Emirates. Connected with the 56-floor Jumeirah Emirates Towers Hotel by a retail boulevard, the two towers form what is commonly referred to as the Emirates Towers complex. The Emirates Office Tower One is taller than the neighbouring Jumeirah Emirates Towers Hotel, but has two fewer floors. Construction of the building was completed on 3 November 1999.

Design and Style 

The Emirates Office Tower is located in the financial centre of Dubai. The Emirates Towers complex designed by NORR represents modern business age architecture. Two equilateral triangles are one of their kind in Dubai. The tower consists of three large core walls. The walls support the load transferred at four levels by large steel trusses, which are connected to the cores with the aid of post tensioning and shear stud connection. A curved wall rising almost the whole height of one face of the triangular building provides a view of the city.

The Emirates Office Tower building is surrounded by clad in silver aluminium panels, silver and copper reflective glass. Flanking each tower at the base is a low curvilinear structure, that houses parking and service elements. Landscaping is an integral feature of the design with undulating land forms, water features, and a variety of plants creating a unique development in downtown Dubai. Located along the Sheikh Zayed road the buildings are one of the most distinctive pairs of skyscrapers.

See also 
 List of tallest buildings and structures in the world
 List of tallest freestanding structures in the world
 List of tallest buildings in Dubai
 List of tallest office buildings in the world
 Emirates Towers

References

External links 
 Emirates Tower One on CTBUH Skyscraper Center

Office buildings completed in 1999
Postmodern architecture in Dubai
Skyscraper office buildings in Dubai
1999 establishments in the United Arab Emirates
Triangular buildings